The Lutheran University of Applied Sciences Nuremberg, (in German: Evangelische Hochschule Nürnberg (EVHN)) was founded in 1995 and is one of the smallest University of Applied Sciences in Bavaria with about 850 students and is under the auspices of the Evangelical Lutheran Church in Bavaria. Thus it is a private university, however with the full academic acknowledgement and accreditation by the Bavarian Ministry of Sciences, Research and the Arts.

Faculty
EvFH Nürnberg has 29 professors.

Organisation
EvFH Nürnberg is organised into the following faculties:
 Faculty of Social Sciences:
 Social work   	
 Social Business Administration	
 Special needs education	
 Faculty of Care Management:
 Care Management
 Health Education (teaching)
 Faculty of Religious Studies:
 Adult Educationand
 Diakonik (Christian Social Work)

See also

 Education in Germany
 List of universities in Germany

External links
 Website in German
 Website in English

Education in Nuremberg
Universities of Applied Sciences in Germany
Lutheran universities and colleges in Europe
Nuremberg